The Cunningham-Hall Aircraft Corporation was an American aircraft manufacturer from its formation in 1928 to its closure in 1948.

History
The company was formed in 1928 at Rochester, New York.  It was a combination of Randolph F. Hall, some former employees of Thomas-Morse Aircraft Corporation and James Cunningham, Son and Company who manufactured motor cars. The company built five different aircraft designs, most were only built in single numbers or no more than prototypes. The last design appeared in 1937 and the company concentrated on sub-contract component production before it was dissolved in 1948.

Aircraft designs

Cunningham-Hall PT-6
Cunningham-Hall X-89 "Mystery Ship" Biplane, with small-chord upper wing.
Cunningham-Hall X-90
Cunningham-Hall GA-21M

Cunningham-Hall GA-36
Cunningham-Hall PT-6F

See also
 Cunningham automobile

References

 The Illustrated Encyclopedia of Aircraft (Part Work 1982–1985). London: Orbis Publishing.

Defunct aircraft manufacturers of the United States
Manufacturing companies established in 1928
1928 establishments in New York (state)
Manufacturing companies disestablished in 1948
1948 disestablishments in New York (state)